Yuichi Shoda is a Japanese-born psychologist and academic who contributed to the development of the cognitive-affective personality system theory of personality.

Biography
Shoda was born and grew up in Japan. He studied physics at Hokkaido University in Sapporo. After attending the University of California, Santa Cruz, he started graduate school in psychology at Stanford, and finished at Columbia University with a PhD degree in psychology in 1990. He joined the University of Washington in 1996.

In 1995 he co-authored with Walter Mischel a paper presenting the "cognitive-affective system theory of personality", stating that people's behavior changes across situations, but behind the change, something important about the person is unchanged. These relatively unchanging qualities include the person's "meaning system", including the categories and concepts through which she or he experiences the social world, and the belief and value networks that guide responses to specific social situations. This could be considered a form of "higher order" stability, analogous to the notion of "higher order" invariants in mathematics. These personal qualities are reflected in the person's "behavioral signature," the set of if (situation) then (behavior) patterns that characterize each person. From 2012 to 2015, Shoda served as an Associate Editor of Social Psychological and Personality Science. Currently, he serves as an Associate Editor of Journal of Personality and Social Psychology.

Selected works
 Whitsett, D. D., & Shoda, Y.  ( 2014 ).  Examining the Heterogeneity of the Effects of Situations across Individuals Does Not Require A Priori Identification and Measurement of Individual Difference Variables .  Journal of Experimental Social Psychology, 50, 94 - 104.
 Shoda, Y., Wilson, N. L., Whitsett, D. D., Lee - Dussud, J., & Zayas, V. ( 2014 ). The Person as a Cognitive - Affective Processing System: From Quantitative Idiography to Cumulative Science. In M. L. Cooper & R. J. Larsen (Eds.), Handbook of Personality Processes and Individual Differences. Washington, DC, APA Press.  pp. 491 - 513.
 Shoda, Y., Wilson, N. L., Chen, A., Gilmore, A., & Smith, R. E. ( 2013 ). Cognitive - Affective Processing System Analysis of Intra - individual Dynamics in Collaborative Therapeutic Assessment: Translating Basic Theory and Research into Clinical Applications.  Journal of Personality, 81, 554 - 568.
 Shoda, Y., Cervone, D., & Downey, G. (Eds.) (2007).  Persons in context: Building a science of the individual.   New York:  Guilford Press.
 Shoda, Y., & Mischel, W. (2000). Reconciling contextualism with the core assumptions of personality psychology. European Journal of Personality, 14, 407–428.
 Cervone, D., & Shoda, Y. (Eds.) (1999). The coherence of personality: Social-cognitive bases of personality consistency, variability, and organization. NY: Guilford.
 Shoda, Y., & Mischel, W. (1993).  Cognitive social approach to dispositional inferences: What if the perceiver is a cognitive-social theorist? Personality and Social Psychology Bulletin, 19, 574–585.
 Shoda, Y., Mischel, W., & Wright, J. C. (1993). Links between personality judgments and contextualized behavior patterns: Situation-behavior profiles of personality prototypes. Social Cognition, 4, 399–429.
 Shoda, Y., Mischel, W., & Peake, P. K. (1990).  Predicting adolescent cognitive and social competence from preschool delay of gratification: Identifying diagnostic conditions. Developmental Psychology, 26, 978–986.

Awards 
Shoda is a recipient of the Golden Goose Award and the dissertation award from the Society of Experimental Social Psychology.

Notes

Living people
Hokkaido University alumni
University of California, Santa Cruz alumni
Stanford University alumni
21st-century American psychologists
American academics of Japanese descent
Japanese emigrants to the United States
Teachers College, Columbia University alumni
University of Washington faculty
Year of birth missing (living people)